Andrew Ma'ilei (born 24 May 1980) is a rugby union footballer who plays at centre. Ma'ilei plays for Bordeaux in the Top 14. He also plays for Tonga and competed at the 2011 Rugby World Cup.

Club

 2004-2005 : North Harbour Rugby Union, New Zealand
 2005-2006 : Connacht, Ireland
 2006-2009 : Kintetsu Liners, Japan
 2009 : North Harbour Rugby Union, New Zealand
 2010-2013 : Bordeaux Bègles, France
 2013 : CA Brive, France

References

External links
 
 
 

1980 births
Living people
Tonga international rugby union players
Rugby union players from Auckland
New Zealand sportspeople of Tongan descent
New Zealand expatriate rugby union players
Tongan expatriate rugby union players
Expatriate rugby union players in France
New Zealand expatriate sportspeople in France
Tongan expatriate sportspeople in France
Union Bordeaux Bègles players
Rugby union centres